Les Mots may refer to:
 "Les Mots" (song), a 2001 single by Mylène Farmer and Seal
 Les Mots (album), a 2001 album by Mylène Farmer
 Les Mots (book), the 1963 autobiography of Jean-Paul Sartre